Sijsele is a village in the municipality of Damme, a part of the province of West Flanders, Belgium. It is also known as 'Sijsele-City' for the locals in and around Sijsele.

External links

Sijsele @ City Review

Populated places in West Flanders
Damme